John Hyden (born October 7, 1972, in Tustin, California) is an American volleyball and beach volleyball player. Raised in San Diego, California, where he attended Mt. Carmel High School, Hyden was a member of the United States men's national volleyball team that finished in ninth place at the 1996 Summer Olympics in Atlanta, Georgia. A 2-time All American at San Diego State University he was named to 1995 World Cup team and played as an outside hitter. At the 2000 Summer Olympics he finished in 11th place with Team USA.

Hyden also plays beach volleyball as a defender. He has been playing several years on the Association of Volleyball Professionals (AVP) circuit, remaining consistently in the top 8 teams.  He has had several 2nd-place finishes and got a first-place finish in 2005.  2007 has seen him with many 3rd & 5th-place finishes.  He also won the coveted "God of the Beach" tournament in Las Vegas in 2007 and 2008.

References

External links
  John Hyden at The Washington Post
 
 

1972 births
Living people
American men's volleyball players
Beach volleyball defenders
Volleyball players at the 1996 Summer Olympics
Volleyball players at the 2000 Summer Olympics
Olympic volleyball players of the United States
Sportspeople from California
Sportspeople from Pensacola, Florida
San Diego State Aztecs men's volleyball players